The Lost Daughter may refer to:

Books
 The Lost Daughter (novel), a 2006 novel by Elena Ferrante
 The Lost Daughter, a 1999 novel by Joanna Hines
 The Lost Daughter, a 2011 novel by Lucretia Grindle
 The Lost Daughter, a 2017 novel by David Ashton
 The Lost Daughter and Other Stories of the Heart, an 1857 short story collection by Caroline Lee Hentz
 The Lost Daughter, a 2013 memoir by Mary Williams

Film and television
 The Lost Daughter (film), a 2021 film based on Elena Ferrante's novel
 Palace 3: The Lost Daughter, a 2014 Chinese television series
 The Lost Daughter, a 1997 TV film directed by Roger Cardinal
 "The Lost Daughter", a 1997 episode of the German TV series Alarm für Cobra 11 – Die Autobahnpolizei
 "The Lost Daughter", a 2018 episode of the Philippine television drama Onanay